Savarde Budhruk  situated in the south-west corner of Maharashtra, India. The population of Savarde Bk was approx 6000 as per the 2001 census. As is the case in most of the Maharashtra cities, the main language spoken here is Marathi.

Cities and towns in Kolhapur district